Ghurak-e Olya (also Romanized as Ghūrak-e ‘Olyā; also known as Ghūrak, Ghūrak-e Bālā, and Qūrak) is a village in Babuyi Rural District, Basht District, Basht County, Kohgiluyeh and Boyer-Ahmad Province, Iran. At the 2006 census, its population was 148, in 29 families.

References 

Populated places in Basht County